Robert Hope may refer to:

Robert Marsden Hope (1919–1999), New South Wales Supreme Court judge
Robert Hope (Australian politician) (1812–1878), medical practitioner and member of the Victorian Legislative Council
Robert Hope-Jones (1859–1914), English musician
Robert Hope of the Hope baronets
Bobby Hope (1943–2022), Scottish footballer
Rob Hope (runner) (born 1974), English fell runner

See also
Bob Hope (disambiguation)